Hemerocoetinae is a subfamily of percomorph bony fishes, they are part of the duckbill family Percophidae.

Genera
The following genera are included within the Hemerocoetinae:

 Acanthaphritis Günther, 1880
 Dactylopsaron Parin, 1990
 Enigmapercis Whitley, 1936
 Hemerocoetes Valenciennes, 1837
 Matsubaraea Taki, 1953
 Osopsaron Jordan & Starks, 1904
 Pteropsaron Jordan & Snyder, 1902
 Squamicreedia Rendahl, 1921

References

Percophidae